Robertus le Bynt was an English Member of Parliament.

He was a Member (MP) of the Parliament of England for Lewes in 1307.

References

13th-century births
14th-century deaths
14th-century English people
People from Lewes
English MPs 1307